Plaza West Covina (formerly Westfield West Covina, and before that Plaza at West Covina, West Covina Fashion Plaza, and West Covina Plaza) is a large regional shopping mall in West Covina, California, owned by the Starwood Capital Group. Its anchor stores are Macy's, JCPenney, XXI Forever, Nordstrom Rack, Best Buy, and Gold's Gym with one vacant space last occupied by Sears. Westfield America, Inc., a precursor to Westfield Group, acquired the shopping center in 1998 and renamed it "Westfield Shoppingtown West Covina", dropping the "Shoppingtown" name in June 2005. In October 2013, the Westfield Group sold the mall to Starwood Capital Group and the mall is now managed by Pacific Retail Capital Partners.

History

Penney's and West Covina Center (1954)
The history of what is now Plaza West Covina dates back to two original shopping centers.

In 1954, plans were announced for the new 36-acre, 50-store West Covina Center at the eastern end of what is now the Plaza space anchored by a 50,000 square-foot J. C. Penney, with parking for over 2,000 cars. It was to cost $5 million, financed and built by Los Angeles financier Sylvan S. Shulman and associates. It was stated at the time that the Penney's would be "West Covina's metropolitan-type store".

Broadway/Desmond's "Plaza" (1962)
The Broadway, opened August 6, 1962 and Desmond's, a specialty retailer, opened April 30, 1962, anchoring a new West Covina Plaza, at the northwest end of what is now the Plaza. The complex would be incorporated into the later Plaza, but was demolished in 1974 except for The Broadway and Desmond's.

Deterioration
By 1968, the city of West Covina's general plan identified deterioration in the shopping centers district, such as poor traffic circulation, noting that it was one of the first cities in the country to identify deterioration in a modern planned shopping center district. Traffic circulation was poor, the Penney's-anchored "Center" was "poorly built and planned" and the Broadway-anchored "Plaza" while "built to a high standard of architectural and landscaping design", "could use some color to add to its appeal", according to the study.

Fashion Plaza (1975)
In 1973, plans were announced to build a new, large, enclosed mall to replace the two existing malls, to be known as "West Covina Fashion Plaza", which would open in 1975. Sylvan S. Shulman was the developer and Burke Kober Nicolais was the architect.

The old centers would be demolished, except for The Broadway–Desmond's complex.

JCPenney moved from its old building at the "Center" at 1120 West Garvey into its new building which opened together with 40 mall shops on October 22, 1975 and measured  including the freestanding auto center
Bullock's opened on September 25, 1975
The 1962 Broadway building remained as an anchor of the new mall
Desmond's folded in the late 1970s and became a 2-story Tower Records location.

1990s
In 1991, then-named Sylvan S. Shulman Co. changed the official name of the mall to "Plaza at West Covina". In 1992–1993, a new wing anchored by Robinsons-May was constructed east of the Bullock's store. The first major anchor changes didn't come until 1996, when Federated Department Stores sold The Broadway store to Bloomingdale's, but due to lease issues, it became a Sears instead, and converted the Bullock's location to Macy's. Sears opened their new location in 1996, moving from a nearby stand-alone location in Covina.

2000s and Expansion
On September 9, 2006, Federated renamed the old Robinsons-May store as Macy's and temporarily operated two stores at the mall.

Tower Records closed in late 2006. The mall's parking lot was also home to the newest Bob's Big Boy restaurant, which was located in the old Chevy's space (since closing) and a new concert venue known as Crazy Horse Live.

In the late 2000s the mall was redeveloped:
Phase I was the expansion of the former Robinsons-May space into an  Macy's.
Phase II consisted of:
Phase II includes the addition of the Best Buy, which relocated from an older location across from the mall, and remodel and flagship introduction of Forever 21. 

2010s
In 2015, Sears Holdings spun off 235 properties, including the Sears at Plaza West Covina, into Sertiage Growth Properties.

On November 7, 2019, it was announced that Sears would be closing this location a part of a plan to close 96 stores nationwide. The store closed on February 16, 2020.

In October 2020, Spirit Halloween opened up a temporary location in the vacant Sears space for the Halloween Season. As of November 2, 2020, Spirit Halloween moved out of the building, leaving the space now vacant.

Plaza West Covina Today
Plaza West Covina is a large regional mall with 185 shops, stores, and restaurants. The mall is two levels and is anchored by Macy's to the east, JCPenney to the south, former Sears to the west, Best Buy to the north, the newly opened XXI Forever flagship store (to the north) and Nordstrom Rack. There is a food court on the second level as well as other restaurants, and other food & drink kiosks. The Mall features many fashion shops such as; H&M, Sephora, M.A.C., Hollister, Express, American Eagle Outfitters, and The Children's Place.

References

External links
Official Plaza  West Covina website
Aerial photo of the Broadway-Desmond's "Fashion Plaza" (front) and "Plaza" (back), 1962
Photo of sign for West Covina Plaza shopping center 1960s
Photo of Penney's and Newberry's at West Covina Plaza, 1960s
Store list of West Covina Fashion Plaza, September 1976

Shopping malls in the San Gabriel Valley
Shopping malls established in 1975
West Covina, California